The European Language Equality Network (ELEN) is an international non-governmental organization that is active at the European level which works to protect and promote European lesser-used languages (lesser-used languages), i.e. regional languages, minority languages, endangered languages, co-official languages and national languages of small nations.

History
ELEN was formed after the closure of EBLUL, European Bureau for Lesser-Used Languages, a non-governmental organization with similar goals founded in 1982 and closed in 2010.

Missions 
The missions and work of the NGO fall into different types of intervention:

 lobbying work aimed at the main international organizations involved in the defense of human and collective rights (United Nations, Council of Europe, European Union). ELEN presents itself as the voice of the least audible minorities, in particular by bringing demands to elected bodies such as the European Parliament. The NGO also carries out actions at local level, for example by engaging in the national campaign in favor of the ratification of the European Charter for Regional or Minority Languages in France, by committing to or bringing to the United Nations a report deploring the attitude of the Spanish government towards non-Spanish speaking minorities, and by associating itself with the concerns of the defenders of minority languages in the departure of the United Kingdom from the European Union.
 initiating or participating  in monitoring and action projects on minority languages.

ELEN notably contributed to the launch of the Protocol for the Guarantee of Linguistic Rights of San Sebastián,  which lists concrete measures to ensure respect for linguistic rights in Europe, as well as to the Digital Language Diversity Project, a project for creating and sharing of digital content using minority languages.

References

External links 
 

Language policy of the European Union
Cultural organizations based in France